Nsama District is a district of Northern Province, Zambia. It was created by splitting Kaputa District.

References 

Districts of Northern Province, Zambia